Trae Bailey Coyle (born 11 January 2001) is an English professional footballer who plays as a winger for Swiss club Lausanne-Sport.

Club career
Born in Camden, Coyle began his career at Arsenal, joining the club in 2009. He signed on loan for Gillingham in August 2020. He scored his first goal for Gillingham in an EFL Trophy tie against Crawley Town on 8 September 2020. He was recalled by Arsenal in January 2021.

On 21 June 2021 he moved to Swiss club Lausanne-Sport.

International career
He has represented England at under-17 level.

References

External links

2001 births
Living people
Black British sportspeople
English footballers
England youth international footballers
Arsenal F.C. players
Gillingham F.C. players
FC Lausanne-Sport players
English Football League players
Association football forwards
English expatriate footballers
English expatriate sportspeople in Switzerland
Expatriate footballers in Switzerland
Swiss Super League players
Swiss Challenge League players